Caesium titanate or cesium titanate is an inorganic compound with the formula Cs2TiO3.  Like most other inorganic titanates, it adopts a polymeric structure with Cs-O and Ti-O bonds.

Other caesium titanates include Cs2Ti5O11 and Cs2Ti6O13 and the hydrate Cs2Ti5O11•1.5H2O.

References

Titanates
Caesium compounds